Redwood Valley (formerly Basil) is a census-designated place (CDP) in Mendocino County, California, United States. Potter Valley is to the east and Calpella to the south. The ZIP Code is 95470, and the community is in area code 707. The population of the CDP was 1,843 at the 2020 census.

History
The place was called "Basil" by the railroad when it reached there; when the post office opened in 1920, the place was called "Redwood Valley".

Jim Jones' Peoples Temple was located in Redwood Valley for a short time. The site was chosen because Jones believed that it was one of the few places in the world likely to survive a nuclear holocaust.

Redwood Valley was one of the areas where Black Bart operated.

Geography
Redwood Valley is in eastern Mendocino County, at the headwaters of the West Fork of the Russian River.

Demographics

2010
The 2010 United States Census reported that Redwood Valley had a population of 1,729. The racial makeup of Redwood Valley was 1,432 (82.8%) White, 7 (0.4%) African American, 63 (3.6%) Native American, 10 (0.6%) Asian, 1 (0.1%) Pacific Islander, 155 (9.0%) from other races, and 61 (3.5%) from two or more races. Hispanic or Latino of any race were 305 persons (17.6%).

The Census reported that 1,723 people (99.7% of the population) lived in households, 6 (0.3%) lived in non-institutionalized group quarters, and 0 (0%) were institutionalized.

There were 640 households, out of which 217 (33.9%) had children under the age of 18 living in them, 354 (55.3%) were opposite-sex married couples living together, 76 (11.9%) had a female householder with no husband present, 34 (5.3%) had a male householder with no wife present.  There were 45 (7.0%) unmarried opposite-sex partnerships, and 8 (1.3%) same-sex married couples or partnerships. 133 households (20.8%) were made up of individuals, and 42 (6.6%) had someone living alone who was 65 years of age or older. The average household size was 2.69.  There were 464 families (72.5% of all households); the average family size was 3.06.

The population was spread out, with 411 people (23.8%) under the age of 18, 144 people (8.3%) aged 18–24, 390 people (22.6%) aged 25–44, 562 people (32.5%) aged 45–64, and 222 people (12.8%) who were 65 years of age or older.  The median age was 41.2 years. For every 100 females, there were 96.3 males.  For every 100 females aged 18 and over, there were 93.3 males.

The homeowner vacancy rate was 1.2%; the rental vacancy rate was 3.5%. 1,276 people (73.8% of the population) lived in owner-occupied housing units and 447 people (25.9%) lived in rental housing units.

2000
In 2000, the United States did not define a census-designated place called Redwood Valley, but it did define a Zip Code Tabulation Area (ZCTA) in the area, 95470. Because Redwood Valley is contained within this ZCTA, it is possible to obtain Census data from the United States 2000 Census for the area even though data for "Redwood Valley" is unavailable.

As of the census of 2000, there were 5,975 people, 2,088 households, and 1,613 families residing in the Redwood Valley ZIP code 95470.  There were 2,184 housing units.  The racial makeup of the area was 84.5% White, 0.3% African American, 5.0% Native American, 1.0% Asian, 0.2% Pacific Islander, 5.8% from other races, and 3.3% from two or more races.  12.4% of the population were Hispanic or Latino of any race.

There were 2,088 households, out of which 34.9% had children under the age of 18 living with them, 61.1% were married couples living together, 10.9% had a female householder with no husband present, and 22.7% were non-families. 17.4% of all households were made up of individuals, and 5.7% had someone living alone who was 65 years of age or older.  The average household size was 2.82 and the average family size was 3.11.

In the area the population was spread out, with 27.1% under the age of 18, 7.2% from 18 to 24, 26.1% from 25 to 44, 28.7% from 45 to 64, and 10.9% who were 65 years of age or older.  The median age was 39.4 years. For every 100 females, there were 103 males.  For every 100 females age 18 and over, there were 101 males.

The median income for a household in the ZIP code was $44,112, and the median income for a family was $48,703. Males had a median income of $37,917 versus $24,413 for females. The per capita income for the area was $21,503.  7.9% of the population and 6.3% of families were below the poverty line.   7.5% of those under the age of 18 and 4.4% of those 65 and older were living below the poverty line.

Politics

Redwood Valley is in Mendocino County's 1st Supervisors district; it is represented by Glenn McGourty, a resident of the 1st district.

Industry
Redwood Valley is primarily residential and agricultural.  The primary crop by far is winegrapes, with many estate and independent vineyards.  There are over a dozen wineries in the area, which participate in an annual wine-tasting event each Father's Day called A Taste of Redwood Valley.

Schools
Redwood Valley is part of the Ukiah Unified School District. Due to a budget shortfall, Redwood Valley Elementary School was closed in June 2010. Its fourth grade and younger students were dispersed to Calpella Elementary in Calpella and its fifth and sixth grade students were absorbed into Eagle Peak Middle School. UUSD students from the area attend Ukiah High School in Ukiah for grades 9–12.

Redwood Valley is also home of the Redwood Valley Outdoor Education Project, an organization which works with elementary schools in the district to provide hands-on science education.

In addition, Redwood Valley is the home of Deep Valley Christian School (Preschool to High School) which is accredited by the Western Association of Schools and Colleges.

Other places of interest
Redwood Valley is home to the Redwood Valley Rancheria and the Coyote Valley Reservation of the native Pomo people.

Abhayagiri Monastery and Holy Transfiguration Monastery are located at the north end of Redwood Valley.

See also

 Northwestern Pacific Railroad

References

External links

 Redwood Valley, CA Travel Information

Census-designated places in Mendocino County, California
Census-designated places in California